Presque-isle (from the French presqu'île, meaning almost island) is a geographical term denoting a piece of land which is closer to being an island than most peninsulas because of its being joined to the mainland by an extremely narrow neck of land.

List of presque-isles
Peñón de Vélez de la Gomera in Spain
Monte Argentario in Italy
Quiberon in Brittany, France
Saint-Malo in Brittany, France
Mahia Peninsula in the Hawke's Bay Region of New Zealand
Isle of Portland in Dorset, England
Northmavine in Shetland, Scotland
Presqu'ile Provincial Park in Ontario, Canada
Presque Isle State Park in Erie, Pennsylvania, United States
Presque Isle Township in Presque Isle County, Michigan
Catawba Island Township, Ottawa County, Ohio
Presque Isle Park, Marquette, Michigan
Presque Isle in Maine, United States
Presqu'île of Lyon, the central part of the city of Lyon, France
Vũng Tàu City, Bà Rịa–Vũng Tàu province, Vietnam

See also
 Presque Isle
 Tied island
 Tombolo

Coastal and oceanic landforms